Below a list of Scheduled Caste communities and their population according to the 2001 Census of India in the state of Jammu and Kashmir.

See also

 Scheduled Castes

References

Jammu